John Tully (born February 12, 1952) is an American football coach and former player.  He Tully served as the head football coach at Eureka College in Eureka, Illinois from 1990 to 1994 and was Whitworth University in Spokane, Washington, from 1995 to 2013, compiling a career college football coaching record of 131–103.  Tully was also the head baseball coach at Eureka in 1993, tallying mark of 14–14.

Head coaching record

College football

References

External links
 Whitworth profile

1952 births
Living people
American football quarterbacks
Azusa Pacific Cougars football players
Eureka Red Devils baseball coaches
Eureka Red Devils football coaches
San Diego Toreros football coaches
Southern Oregon Raiders football coaches
Whitworth Pirates football coaches
High school football coaches in California
High school football coaches in Oregon
University of San Diego alumni